The Tobacconist may refer to:

The Tobacconist (magazine), a trade paper published by J. Finzer and Brothers Company
The Tobacconist (play), a 1771 play by Francis Gentleman
The Tobacconist (film), a 2018 German film originally named Der Trafikant (de) based on a book with the same name.

See also
Tobacconist, a tobacco merchant